Chinsurah subdivision is an administrative subdivision of the Hooghly district in the state of West Bengal, India.

Overview
The eastern portion of Chinsurah subdivision is part of the Hooghly Flats, a natural physiographic region, that is a narrow strip of land along the Hooghly. The interior of the subdivision is part of the Hooghly-Damodar Plain, the agriculturally rich alluvial plains lying between the Hooghly and the Damodar. The entire area is a part of the Gangetic Delta. The Hooghly is a tidal river and has a high west bank. The Portuguese, the Dutch, the French, the Danes and the British dominated industry, trade and commerce in this area for more than two centuries, and as a result the Hooghly Flats region is highly industrialised.

Subdivisions
The Hooghly district is divided into the following administrative subdivisions:

Administrative units
Chinsurah subdivision has 9 police stations, 5 community development blocks, 5 panchayat samitis, 69 gram panchayats, 756 mouzas, 741 inhabited villages, 2 municipalities, 1 outgrowth and 23 census towns. The municipalities are Hooghly Chinsurah Municipality and Bansberia Municipality. The census towns are: Kola, Hansghara, Raghunathpur, Madhusudanpur, Amodghata, Alikhoja, Shankhanagar, Chak Bansberia, Manushpur, Keota, Kodalia, Naldanga, Kulihanda, Dharmapur, Simla, Badhagachhi, Mirdhanga, Sripur, Jirat, Batika, Pandua, Purusattompur and Namajgram. The subdivision has its headquarters at Hugli-Chuchura.

The right bank of the Hooghly River has been industrialised over a long period. With the leading European powers dominating the area's industry, trade and commerce for over two centuries, it is amongst the leading industrialised areas in the state. At the same time the land is fertile and agricultural production is significant.

In Chinsurah Mogra CD Block 64.87% of the population is urban and 35.13% is rural. Amongst the four remaining CD Blocks in the subdivision two are overwhelmingly rural and two are wholly rural.

The map alongside shows a portion of Chinsurah subdivision. All places marked in the map are linked in the larger full screen map.

Kolkata Urban Agglomeration
The following Municipalities, Outgrowth and Census Towns in Chinsurah subdivision were part of Kolkata Urban Agglomeration in the 2011 census: Hugli-Chinsurah (M), Bansberia (M), Bara Khejuria (Out Growth), Shankhanagar (CT), Amodghata (CT), Chak Bansberia (CT), Naldanga (CT), Kodalia (CT), Kulihanda (CT),  Simla (CT), Dharmapur (CT) and Keota (CT).

Police stations
Police stations in Chinsurah subdivision have the following features and jurisdiction:

Blocks
Community development blocks in Chinsurah subdivision are:

Gram panchayats
The subdivision contains 69 gram panchayats under 5 community development blocks:

 Balagarh block consists of 13 gram panchayats, viz. Baklia Dhobapara, Ektarpur, Somra–I, Charkrishnabati, Guptipara–I, Somra–II, Dumurdaha Nityanandapur–I, Guptipara–II, Sripur–Balagarh, Jirat, Dumurdaha Nityanandapur–II, Mohipalpur and Sija Kamalpur.
 Chinsurah Mogra block consists of 10 gram panchayats, viz. Bandel, Debanandapur, Kodalia–II, Saptagram, Chandrahati–I, Digsui Hoyera, Mogra–I, Chandrahati–II, Kodalia–I and Mogra–II.
 Dhaniakhali block consists of 18 gram panchayats, viz. Belmuri, Dashghara–II, Gudubari–I, Perambua Sahabazar, Bhandarhati–I, Dhanekhali–I, Gudubari–II, Bhandarhati–II, Dhanekhali–II, Gurap, Somaspur–I, Bhastara, Gopinathpur–I, Khajudaha Milki, Somaspur–II,  Dashghara–I, Gopinathpur–II and Mandra.
 Pandua block consists of 16 gram panchayats, viz. Bantika-Boinchee, Jamna, lchhobadaspur, Rameswarpur–Gopalnagar, Beloon Dhamasin, Jamnagar Mondalai, Panchagara–Toregram, Berela-Konchmali-Boragori , Jayer Dwarbasini, Shikhira Chanpta, Haral Daspur, Kshirkundi–Namajgram–Niyasa, Simlagarh Vitasin, Itachuna Khanyan and Sarai–Tinna.
 Polba Dadpur block consists of 12 gram panchayats, viz. Akhna, Dadpur, Mahanad, Rajhat, Amnan, Goswami Malipara, Makalpur, Satithan, Babnan, Harit, Polba and Sugandha.

Economy

Industry
Industries are concentrated in the cities and towns of the Chinsurah Mogra area (outside the CD Block area), along the Hooghly. In the 17th and 18th centuries different industrial units came into existence with the development of various European settlements along the Hooghly. Initially, it was traditional industries, but later comparatively heavier industries came in. Amongst the better known industrial units in Chinsurah subdivision are:

 Dunlop India Ltd. opened its factory at Sahaganj in 1936 and it pioneered the manufacture of a number of products such as automobile and aeroplane tyres, and produced industrial belting later. Pawan Kumar Ruia of the Ruia group, acquired Dunlop from Manu Chhabria’s Jumbo Group in 2005, but has been struggling ever since to restart the closed Sahaganj factory.
 Tribeni Tissues is owned by Paper Boards and Speciality Papers Division of ITC Ltd. at Tribeni.
 The 450 MW Bandel Thermal Power Station, operated  by West Bengal Power Development Corporation, was established at Tribeni in 1983.
 Ascon Agro Products Limited, jointly owned by the SPS Group and the Pailan Group, produces potato flakes at Dhaniakhali. It is locally marketed using the POTO brand. Potato flakes are used to make snacks and are also used as a thickening agent in soups and bakery products. The plant was inaugurated by Buddhadeb Bhattacharjee, the West Bengal chief minister, in 2007.
 S.R.Industry, manufacturer of construction and agricultural machinery, was established at Pandua in 1996.

Handloom weaving
The handloom sarees of Dhaniakhali, Begampur, Jangipara, Rajbalhat areas and dhutis of Haripal, Rajbalhat, Khanakul areas of Hooghly district are widely familiar.

Agriculture
Hooghly is an agriculturally prosperous district of West Bengal. Although the economy has been shifting away from agriculture, it is still the pre-dominant economic activity and the main source of livelihood for the rural people of the district. One third of the district income comes from agriculture. Given below is an overview of the agricultural production (all data in tonnes) for Chinsurah subdivision, other subdivisions and the Hooghly district, with data for the year 2013-14.

Education
Hooghly district had a literacy rate of 81.80% as per the provisional figures of the census of India 2011. Chinsurah subdivision had a literacy rate of 79.17%, Chandannagore subdivision 83.01%, Srirampore subdivision 86.13% and Arambag subdivision 79.05.  

Given in the table below (data in numbers) is a comprehensive picture of the education scenario in Hooghly district for the year 2013-14:

Note: Primary schools include junior basic schools; middle schools, high schools and higher secondary schools include madrasahs; technical schools include junior technical schools, junior government polytechnics, industrial technical institutes, industrial training centres, nursing training institutes etc.; technical and professional colleges include engineering colleges, medical colleges, para-medical institutes, management colleges, teachers training and nursing training colleges, law colleges, art colleges, music colleges etc. Special and non-formal education centres include sishu siksha kendras, madhyamik siksha kendras, centres of Rabindra mukta vidyalaya, recognised Sanskrit tols, institutions for the blind and other handicapped persons, Anganwadi centres, reformatory schools etc.

The following institutions are located in Chinsurah subdivision:

Hooghly Mohsin College was established at Chinsurah in 1836.
Hooghly Women's College was established at Chinsurah in 1949.
Hooghly Engineering and Technology College is an engineering college, established at Pipulhati in 2004.
Abacus Institute of Engineering and Management is an engineering college, established at Natungram, Mogra, in 2008.
Academy of Technology is an engineering college, established at Adisaptagram, Aedconagar in 2003.
Camelia Institute of Technology & Management, is an engineering college, established at Boinchi in 2009. It offers both degree and diploma courses.
Techno India Group Public School, Chinsurah, Hooghly is a CBSE affiliated senior secondary school which was established in 2005 offering education from Play Group to Std. XII.
Saroj Mohan Institute of Technology, is an engineering college, established at Guptipara in 2003.
Modern Institute of Engineering and Technology, is an engineering college, established at Barol-Malimpur, Rajhat (near Bandel) in 2010.
Bengal School of Technology was established in 2006 at Sugandha. It offers undergraduate and post graduate courses in pharmacy.
Polba Mahavidyalaya, a general degree college, was established at Polba in 2005.
Balagarh Bijoy Krishna Mahavidyalaya (Jirat College), a general degree college, was established at Jirat in 1985.
Sarat Centenary College, a general degree college, was established at Dhaniakhali in 1978.
Bejoy Narayan Mahavidyalaya, a general degree college, was established at Itachuna in 1950.
Sreegopal Banerjee College, a general degree college, was established at Bagati, Mogra, in 1958.
Government Training College, a teachers' training college, established at Hugli-Chuchura in 1955.
Indira Gandhi Teachers’ Training College was established at Sultangachha, Pandua.

Healthcare
The table below (all data in numbers) presents an overview of the medical facilities available and patients treated in the hospitals, health centres and sub-centres in 2014 in Hooghly district.  
 

.* Excluding nursing homes

Medical facilities in Chinsurah subdivision are as follows:
Hospitals in: (Name, location, beds)
Hugli District Hospital, Hooghly Chinsurah Municipality, 550 beds
Chunchura Police Hospital, Hooghly Chinsurah Municipality, 98 beds
Hugli Jail Hospital, Hooghly Chinsurah Municipality, 27 beds
Bandel ESI Hospital, Chinsurah Mogra CD Block, PO Bandel, 250 beds
Bandel Railway Hospital, Polba Dadpur CD Block, PO Bandel, 4 beds
Bandel Thermal Power Station Hospital, Bansberia Municipality, PO Tribeni, 10 beds

Rural Hospitals: (Name, block, location, beds) 
Pandua Rural Hospital, Pandua CD Block, Pandua, 30 beds
Dhaniakhali Rural Hospital, Dhaniakhali CD Block, Dhaniakhali, 30 beds
Mogra Rural Hospital, Chinsurah Mogra CD Block, Mogra, 30 beds
Ahmedpur Rural Hospital, Balagarh CD Block, Patuligram, 30 beds
Polba Rural Hospital, Polba Dadpur CD Block, Polba, 30 beds

Primary Health Centres: (CD Block-wise)(CD Block, PHC location, beds) 
Chinsurah Mogra CD Block: Digsui (10 beds), R.N.Debdas (Naldanga), Bandel (6 beds)
Bansberia Municipality: Bansberia (5 beds)
Balagarh CD Block: Bakulia, Bakuliagram (6 beds), Dumurdaha-Nityanadapur, Gopalpur (10 beds), Guptipara (10 beds), Mohipalpur, Bridabanpur (4 beds), Sukharia, Somra (4 beds), Sripur-Bolagarh, Balagarh (10 beds)
Pandua CD Block: B.L.Mukherjee (Boinchigram), Boinchi (10 beds), Itachuna (10 beds), Dwarbasini (4 beds), Ramswarpur-Gopalnagar, Chandpur (10 beds), Haraldaspur, Hatni (10 beds), Jamgram (6 beds).
Polba Dadpur CD Block: Danarpur (10 beds), Makalpur (10 beds), Kamdebpur, Sugandha (4 beds).
Dhaniakhali CD Block: Bhandarhati (10 beds), Chopa (10 beds),  Gurup, Palashi (10 beds), Porabazar (6 beds), Khejurdaha-Milki, Bhastara (10 beds).

Private Hospitals:* (Name, location, beds)
Vivekananda Seva Sadan, Vill & PO Mandra, Dhaniakhali, 25 beds
Jannedra Memorial Child Health Care Hospital, Lions Club, Dhaniakhali, 25 beds
.* Excluding nursing homes

Electoral constituencies
Lok Sabha (parliamentary) and Vidhan Sabha (state assembly) constituencies in Chinsurah subdivision were as follows:

References

Subdivisions of West Bengal
Subdivisions in Hooghly district